ATV may refer to:

Broadcasting
 Amateur television
Analog television

Television stations and companies

 Ràdio i Televisió d'Andorra
 ATV (Armenia)
 ATV (Aruba), NBC affiliate
 ATV (Australian TV station), Melbourne
 ATV (Austria)
 ATV (Canada), the former name of CTV Atlantic 
 ATV Madiun, East Java
 Aluetelevisio, Finland
 Asia Television, Hong Kong online media company and former Hong Kong TV station
 ATV Asia, former Cantonese-language channel
 ATV Home, former Cantonese-language channel
 ATV World, former English-language channel
 ATV (Hungary)
 Aomori Television, Japan
 ATV Jordan
 ATV (Pakistan)
 ATV (Peruvian TV channel)
 ATV (Russia)
 ATV (Suriname)
 ATV (Turkish TV channel)
 Associated Television, United Kingdom (1955–1981)
 ATV Music, a subsidiary, now part of Sony/ATV Music Publishing
 Alternativna TV

Transportation
 All-terrain vehicle, for off-road use
 Advanced Technology Vessel, Indian nuclear submarine project
 Agena target vehicle, a booster system used in the Gemini space program
 Automated Transfer Vehicle, ESA unmanned resupply spacecraft, originally Ariane Transfer Vehicle

Other uses
 ATV Corporation, an audiovisual electronics company founded by Ikutaro Kakehashi
A Tree Viewer, software for displaying phylogenetic trees
 Alternative TV, a British punk/post-punk band
 Advanced Technology Ventures, an American venture capital company
 Apple TV, a set-top box microconsole made by Apple